The Joe Turner Classic is an annual American football game played in Savannah, Georgia at Ted Wright Stadium on the campus of Savannah State University.

History
The first Joe Turner Classic was held in 1993 at Ted Wright Stadium in Savannah, Georgia. The game is dedicated to Joe Turner, a graduate of Savannah State University, and a legendary high school football coach in the state of Georgia.

Joe Turner
Turner coached at Woodville (now Tompkins) High School in the state of Georgia from 1960-80. He was named Georgia High School "Coach of the Year" seven times in a career that featured a won-loss record of 204-101-4 in the high school ranks. Turner served as head football coach of Savannah State coach for three seasons (1947–1949) and compiled a record of 9-13-1. The 1948 team was the Southeastern Athletic Conference champion with a record of 5-3-0.

Joe Turner Merit Award

Game results

See also
 List of black college football classics

References

Black college football classics
Savannah State Tigers football
2009 disestablishments in Georgia (U.S. state)
Recurring sporting events disestablished in 2009
1994 establishments in Georgia (U.S. state)
Recurring sporting events established in 1994